Tomášov is a village and municipality in western Slovakia in  Senec District in the Bratislava Region.

Names and etymology
The name comes from a personal name with the Slavic/Slovak possessive suffix -ov. In historical records the modern name of the village was first mentioned in 1434 (Tomaschoff). In 1456, the village was mentioned as Thamashaza.

Fél (1250, Feel) - the official modern name of Tomášov in the language of the Hungarian national minority was initially a separate village, but nowadays it is part of Tomášov.

Geography 
The municipality lies at an altitude of 128 metres and covers an area of 19.828 km².

History 
In historical records the village was first mentioned on 4 December 1250 as Feél.

There is a baroque manor house built in 18th century on the side of the village.

Population 
It had a population of about 2540 people on 31 December 2016.

References 
https://web.archive.org/web/20070513023228/http://www.statistics.sk/mosmis/eng/run.html

Specific

Villages and municipalities in Senec District